Rochefortia is a genus of flowering plants in family Boraginaceae.

Its species are native to North America, the Caribbean, and South America.

Species
Species include:
 Rochefortia acanthophora (syn: Ehretia acanthophora) − (DC.) Griseb. — Greenheart ebony
 Rochefortia acrantha − Urb.
 Rochefortia brasiliensis − Willd. ex Schult.
 Rochefortia cubensis − Britton & P.Wilson.
 Rochefortia cuneata − Sw.
 Rochefortia cuneata subsp. bahamensis − (Britton) G. Klotz	
 Rochefortia lundellii  − Camp.
 Rochefortia spinosa − (Jacq.) Urb. — Espino

External links
USDA Plants Profile for Rochefortia (rochefortia)
 The Plant List.org — Rochefortia

 
Boraginaceae genera
Flora of North America
Flora of South America
Flora of the Caribbean
Taxonomy articles created by Polbot